Alexander "Xandl" Popovic (18 July 1891 - September 1952) also known by different variations of his last name such as Popovich,  Pops, Poppovich and Popovic I, was a professional football player and manager from Austria.

Club career
He played all of his club football in Vienna, most prominently for Austria Vienna, where he spent over a decade, winning the Austrian Cup twice and the Austrian Championship. He also won the Austrian Championship with Rapid Vienna.

International career
He made his debut for Austria in October 1911 against Germany. He earned 33 caps, scoring one goal.

Coaching career
After retiring from playing, he moved into the management field, managing top clubs in Germany, such as Hertha Berlin and later Italy, where he managed Lazio and Bologna.

Honours
Austrian Football Bundesliga (2):
 1923, 1924
Austrian Cup (2):
 1921, 1924

External links
 
 Rapid stats - Rapid Archive

References

1891 births
1952 deaths
Footballers from Vienna
Austrian footballers
Austria international footballers
Austrian football managers
SK Rapid Wien players
S.S. Lazio managers
S.S.D. Pro Sesto managers
Association football defenders
Expatriate football managers in Germany
Expatriate football managers in Italy